Azat Rakipau (born 29 November 1968) is a Belarusian long-distance runner. He competed in the men's marathon at the 2004 Summer Olympics.

References

External links
 

1968 births
Living people
Athletes (track and field) at the 1992 Summer Olympics
Athletes (track and field) at the 2004 Summer Olympics
Belarusian male long-distance runners
Belarusian male marathon runners
Olympic athletes of the Unified Team
Olympic athletes of Belarus
Place of birth missing (living people)